The 2017–18 Amkar Perm season was their 14th season in the Russian Premier League, the highest tier of association football in Russia, following promotion during the 2003 season. They will participate in the Russian Premier League and Russian Cup.

Squad

Youth squad

Out on loan

Transfers

Summer

In:

Out:

Winter

In:

Out:

Competitions

Russian Premier League

Results by round

Results

League table

Relegation play-offs

Russian Cup

Squad statistics

Appearances and goals

|-
|colspan="14"|Players away from the club on loan:
|-
|colspan="14"|Players who left Amkar Perm during the season:
|}

Goal scorers

Disciplinary record

References

FC Amkar Perm seasons
Amkar Perm